Silver Star Chess is a chess video game for WiiWare. It costs 500 Nintendo Points to download.

Reception
The game has been criticized for its poor artificial intelligence and lack of online multiplayer.

References

2008 video games
Chess software
Video games developed in Japan
WiiWare games
Wii-only games
Wii games
Multiplayer and single-player video games
Agetec games